Hemadpanti Sculpture (also spelled as Hemadpanthi) is an architectural style, named after its founder, the prime minister Hemadpant (1259-1274 CE) of the court of Seuna Yadavas of Devagiri.

Architectural elements
This building style was formed during the 13th Century in Maharashtra, and incorporated black stone and limestone, which were readily available. It also got the status of World Heritage Site.

Notable examples

Khandoba Mandir, Beed.
Gondeshwar temple, Sinnar
Hembadpanti Mahadev Mandir Sakegaon, Sakegaon, Chikhali, Buldhana
Markanda Mahadev, Chamorshi
Tulja Bhavani
Bhagwant Temple, Barshi
Aundha Nagnath Temple
 Vitthal Temple, Pandharpur - but little early work remains. There is also a small temple of Shri. Vitthal, which is as old as the main Vitthal Mandir, in Isbavi area of Pandharpur known as Wakhari Va Korti Devalayas and also known as Visava mandir.
 Palasnath Mandir, Indapur, Pune, now partially submerged in back waters
 Bhimashankar Mandir
 Nagra Temple, Gondia
 Yamai Mandir, Mahalung, near Akluj
 Narsimha Mandir, Partur, near Aurangabad
 Shri Mallikarjun Mandir, Achaler
 Mankeshwar temple, Zodage, Tal. Malegaon, Dist. Nashik, Maharashtra, India.
 Mahadev Mandir, Lohara, Yavatmal
 Bhimashankar Mandir ,Taka [Latur]

References

External links
 Hemadpanthi temple found in Roha TNN Feb 9, 2012

Hindu temple architecture
Indian architectural history
Cultural history of Maharashtra